= Sarbanan =

- Location in Iran
- Coordinates: 37°17′34″N 48°21′57″E
- Country: Iran
- Province: Ardabil Province
- Time zone: UTC+3:30 (IRST)
  - Summer (DST): UTC+4:30 (IRDT)

Sarbanan is a village in the Ardabil Province of Iran.
